The 1996–97 Heineken Cup pool stage was played during October and November 1996. The top two teams in each group qualified for the quarter-finals.

All times are local to the game site.

{| class="wikitable"
|+ Key to colours
|-
| style="background: #ccffcc;" |     
|Top two teams in each group advance to quarter-finals
|}

Pool 1

Pool 2

Pool 3

Pool 4

Seeding

See also
 1996–97 Heineken Cup

References

Pool Stage
1996–97